Stagecoach East Scotland (legally incorporated as Fife Scottish Omnibuses Ltd) is an operating region of Stagecoach UK Bus, with its regional base in Dunfermline, Scotland. The company operators under six different brands.

History
Stagecoach began long distance express coach services in 1981 from its base in Perth, expanding into local bus operation when it bought McLennan of Spittalfield in 1985. Deregulation of bus services in 1986 gave Stagecoach the opportunity to expand operations in Perth, thus fierce competition with the dominant operator Strathtay Scottish began, which eventually saw Stagecoach's then Perth Panther subsidiary emerge as the largest provider of bus services in the Perth area. On the breakup and privatisation of the Scottish Bus Group, Stagecoach was successful in acquiring two of the subsidiaries, namely Northern Scottish Omnibuses Ltd (in March 1991) and Fife Scottish Omnibuses Ltd (in July 1991). Allisons Coaches of Dunfermline was purchased in April 2000.

In August 2003 the UK's first entirely commercial demand responsive bus service was launched by Stagecoach East Scotland in Fife. Trading as Yellow Taxibus and using the AA Buses Ltd legal name (transferred from Stagecoach West Scotland where it was purchased with the AA Buses operation in Ayrshire) the operation combined the benefits of a fixed bus route with the flexibility of pre-booked taxi pick-ups. Yellow Taxibus operated a fleet of eight-seater spacious, upmarket Mercedes-Benz Vito vehicles on a high-frequency service between Dunfermline and Edinburgh seven days a week; however after a two-year trial the loss making service was withdrawn in November 2005.

On 14 December 2005 Stagecoach purchased the Barnsley-based Traction Group, the largest remaining private bus company, for £26 million. The Traction Group owned Strathtay Scottish, which Stagecoach had pushed out of Perth some 16 years earlier. The Strathtay operations bridged the gap between Stagecoach's Fife, Perth and Bluebird operations, giving the group a vast swathe of the country extending from Edinburgh through to Perth, northwards to Aberdeen and round to Inverness, with only Travel Dundee and First Aberdeen being the major non-Stagecoach operators within that area. Unusually, despite the Strathtay fleet receiving the corporate livery, fleet vehicles were branded with Strathtay with Part of the Stagecoach Group straplines.

In early 2007, Stagecoach in Perth started one of two Stagecoach Gold services as a trial for Stagecoach Group. Along with the service run by Stagecoach Warwickshire, they offer newer vehicles to a higher standard, and are in a special gold and blue livery, Since these trials, the Gold brand has expanded across the UK while the Perth service was upgraded with new Alexander Dennis Enviro350Hs.

In October 2007 The Fife operations invested £4.5 million in upgrading the Express Network as "Express City Connect" and "Experience City Connect" 
West Fife to Edinburgh routes received nine new Scania Omnilink Tri-Axle single-deckers with full leather trim and Wi-Fi Internet access. The rest of the Express network received 20 brand new Plaxton Profile Volvo B7R Coaches with full leather trim and Wi-Fi Internet access and were used on X24/X26 and X54 services, (which supplement the Volvo B7R Coaches brought in 2006 for X27 and X59 routes.) In 2011, new Plaxton Elite coaches (with leather seats & Wi-Fi Internet Access) X59 routes were brought to help deal with the increase in passengers, which new stock appear in 2012, 2013 and 2016 and 2017. This has resulted in the brand receiving the accolade of Top Express Operation at the UK Coach Awards (2015, 2016, 2017).

In March 2008, it was announced that Stagecoach Fife had bought Rennies of Dunfermline for an undisclosed sum. The Rennies fleet was 60 vehicles, and included 18 double-deckers which were all leased from Stagecoach in Fife. Rennies were formerly based at Dunfermline (Wellwood Mill), before moving to Cowdenbeath in 2016.

In Spring 2014, Stagecoach entered the South Queensferry area replacing a similar service which had been run for many years by First Scotland East. However, the  South Queensferry operation incurred huge losses and was withdrawn in June 2017, with Lothian Buses subsequently taking it over.

Throughout 2018 and 2019, the company saw major reform through both its fleet and routes such as the reinstating of the X56 trialled in 2016 and new buses for routes 747, X56 & X60/X61.

Park & Ride sites
Since 1999, Stagecoach East Scotland has operated and provide numerous park & ride sites across their operating area.

 Ferrytoll Park & Ride located in Fife, north of the Forth Road Bridge (in partnership with Fife Council), opened in November 1999.
 Halbeath Park & Ride located on the outskirts of Dunfermline in Fife (in partnership with Fife Council), opened in November 2012.
 Broxden Park & Ride located on the western edge of Perth, which also connect with Scottish Citylink and Megabus services (in partnership with Perth & Kinross Council).
Kinross Park & Ride located to the East of Junction 6 on the M90 motorway.

Operation
Stagecoach East Scotland operates under six different brands:
Stagecoach in Perth, a trading name of Stagecoach (Scotland) Ltd, is used for services in and around Perth.
Stagecoach in Fife is used for services throughout Fife and beyond to Dundee and Edinburgh, and is a trading name of Fife Scottish Omnibuses Ltd. It has operated a number of  experimental services including Yellow Taxibus  and a hovercraft service from Kirkcaldy to Portobello in July 2007.
Stagecoach Strathtay is the brand used for services within the city of Dundee and throughout Angus, with some services reaching Perth and into Aberdeenshire. 
Rennie's, now based at former Fife Scottish Cowdenbeath bus depot operates tours and school buses with the company.
 The company also provides vehicles for Megabus and Scottish Citylink long distance express work within Scotland, and beyond to Manchester and London.

Depots
Arbroath (Peasiehill Road) (o/s Forfar (Prior Road))
Blairgowrie (Haugh Road)
Cowdenbeath (Broad Street) (Rennies)
Dunfermline (St Leonards Street)
Glenrothes (Flemington Road)
Leven (Methilhaven Road - Aberhill)
Perth (Ruthvenfield Road) (o/s Spittalfield)
St Andrews (City Road)

References

External links
Stagecoach in Fife
Stagecoach in Perth
Stagecoach Strathtay
Scotsman report on Yellow 
Fife Ferrytoll website
Halbeath Park & Ride

Transport in Fife
Transport in Perth and Kinross
Transport in Angus, Scotland
Transport in Dundee
Stagecoach Group bus operators in Scotland